The Garda Mounted Support Unit is the horseback mounted division of the Garda Síochána.

It is part of the Operational Support Unit which provides specialist support to Gardaí nationwide. The Operational Support Unit also includes the Water Support, Dog Support and Air Support units.

History and Formation
Historically, the predecessor to the Garda Mounted unit was the Dublin Horse Police which was part of the Dublin Metropolitan Police.  This was disbanded in 1913 due to a lack of suitable horses for military requirements in Britain. The Garda Mounted Unit was formed in 1998 when the North Yorkshire Police disbanded its mounted unit allowing the Gardaí to acquire its horses and equipment. It became operational on 17 May that year.

Current Operation
The unit has its base in the Phoenix Park with stables at Áras an Uachtaráin and not at the Garda Headquarters. The Unit has a strength of Two Sergeants and Sixteen Gardaí with fourteen horses with plans for expansion to fifteen horses. The Irish Draught Horse is the preferred breed for the Mounted Unit.

Functions
The Units general duties are high visibility crime prevention and include:-
Community Policing.
Event Policing.
Support to mainstream Garda operations.
Crowd Control & Public Order.
Searches for Missing Persons in inaccessible Areas.

Operations
The Garda Mounted Unit typically attends at large public gatherings such as sporting occasions and concerts as well as other events such as the Ballinasloe Horse Fair, the Dublin Horse Show at the RDS and National Ploughing Championships. It also attends the Dublin St Patricks Day parade and other State Occasions on a ceremonial basis. The Mounted Unit also attended the  2009 All-Ireland Hurling Final

References

External links
 Mounted Unit page on Garda website

Garda Síochána units